Trinidad and Tobago, officially the Republic of Trinidad and Tobago, is a twin island country situated off the northern edge of the South American mainland,  off the coast of northeastern Venezuela and  south of Grenada. Trinidad and Tobago is one of the wealthiest and most developed nations in the Caribbean and is listed in the top 40 (2010 information) of the 70 High Income countries in the world. Its GNI per capita of US$20,070 (2014 GNI at Atlas Method) is one of the highest in the Caribbean.  In November 2011, the OECD removed Trinidad and Tobago from its list of Developing Countries. Trinidad's economy is strongly influenced by the petroleum industry. Tourism and manufacturing are also important to the local economy. Tourism is a growing sector, although not as proportionately important as in many other Caribbean islands. Agricultural products include citrus and cocoa.

Notable firms 
This list includes notable companies with primary headquarters located in the country. The industry and sector follow the Industry Classification Benchmark taxonomy. Organizations which have ceased operations are included and noted as defunct.

See also 
 Economy of Trinidad and Tobago
 List of airlines of Trinidad and Tobago

References 

Trinidad and Tobago